Thomas Farrington may refer to:

 Thomas Farrington (British Army officer) (1664–1712), British Army officer and politician
 Thomas Farrington (died 1758), British politician
 Thomas Farrington (American politician) (1798–1872), American lawyer and politician